William Joseph Connors (November 2, 1941 – June 18, 2018) was an American player, coach and front office official in professional baseball.

Playing career
When he was 12, Connors was a member of the Schenectady All-Star team that won the 1954 Little League World Series, beating the team from Colton, California, 7–5. He graduated from Linton High School in Schenectady in 1959 and attended Syracuse University for two years. He signed with the Chicago Cubs as a pitcher-infielder in 1961. During a season split between the Class B Northwest League and the Class D Sophomore League, Connors batted only .226 with no home runs and 32 runs batted in while hurling 29 innings as a pitcher. In 1962 in the Class D Florida State League, Connors was converted to pitcher-catcher, and improved his batting mark to .296 with two homers and 35 RBI. He also increased his pitching load to 64 innings and posted a 2.64 earned run average. In 1963, back in the Northwest League, he became a full-time pitcher, winning 12 games and notching 138 strike outs.

During 1966, a season in which he compiled the fourth-lowest ERA in the Pacific Coast League, Connors was recalled by the Cubs, pitching in 16 innings over 11 games, but he failed to stick with Chicago and was sent back to the PCL for 1967. His contract was purchased by the New York Mets in August of that year, and he spent the remainder of his active career with the Mets (27 innings pitched in 1967–1968) and their farm teams. In his 26 Major League games, Connors worked in 43 innings and posted an 0–2 won/lost mark and an ERA of 7.53.

Coach and front-office executive
Connors' off-field career began in 1971 as the Mets' batting practice pitcher. He then became a minor league pitching instructor for the Mets (1972–76) and Philadelphia Phillies (1977–79) before embarking on a 17-year career as a pitching coach in Major League Baseball. He served with the Kansas City Royals (1980–81), Cubs (1982–86; 1991–93), Seattle Mariners (1987–88), and three terms with the New York Yankees (1989–90; 1994–95; 2000). His brief term in 2000 came on an interim basis during the medical leave of absence of longtime Yanks' coach Mel Stottlemyre.

From 1996 to 2012, as vice president, player personnel,  Connors was a member of the Yankees' front office, holding a senior position in the Bombers' player development system and based in the team's Tampa, Florida, minor league headquarters, working alongside Mark Newman, the club's longtime player development boss, and in close proximity to the team's owners, the George Steinbrenner family.  He was reassigned by the Yankees in September 2012.

Connors died June 18, 2018.

References

External links
, or Retrosheet, or Pura Pelota (Venezuelan Winter League)

1941 births
2018 deaths
American expatriate baseball players in Venezuela
Baseball coaches from New York (state)
Baseball players from New York (state)
Carlsbad Potashers players
Chicago Cubs coaches
Chicago Cubs players
Dallas–Fort Worth Spurs players
Fort Worth Cats players
Jacksonville Suns players
Kansas City Royals coaches
Major League Baseball executives
Major League Baseball farm directors
Major League Baseball pitchers
Major League Baseball pitching coaches
Minor league baseball managers
Navegantes del Magallanes players
New York Mets players
New York Yankees coaches
New York Yankees executives
Palatka Cubs players
Pompano Beach Mets players
Salt Lake City Bees players
Seattle Mariners coaches
Sportspeople from Schenectady, New York
Syracuse Orangemen baseball players
Syracuse University alumni
Tacoma Cubs players
Tidewater Tides players
Wenatchee Chiefs players